Richard Low Drury (May 2, 1863 – September 4, 1915) was a Canadian politician. He served in the Legislative Assembly of British Columbia from 1903 to 1907  from the electoral district of Victoria City, as a Liberal. Drury died in 1915 from the effects of diabetes.

References

1863 births
1915 deaths
British Columbia Liberal Party MLAs